Matthew Adam Casey (born 13 November 1999) is an English professional footballer who plays for Gosport Borough as a defender.

Club career

Portsmouth
Casey signed a third year scholarship deal in May 2018 after two years with the under-18s. He made his Portsmouth first-team debut on 4 December 2018 in a 2–1 win against Arsenal U21s in the Checkatrade Trophy.

On 8 February 2019, Casey signed for Basingstoke Town, on a loan deal until the end of the season but played only once for them before returning to Gosport Borough on loan.

On 26 June 2019, Casey signed his first professional contract with Portsmouth.

During his time in the Portsmouth squad Casey was given the nickname 'Rodney' due to his striking resemblance to Rodney Trotter from Only Fools and Horses.

On 21 September 2019, Casey moved to Havant & Waterlooville on loan and made his debut on the same day in a 2-1 win against Taunton Town in the FA Cup. 

Casey was released by Portsmouth at the end of the 2019–20 season.

Gosport Borough

On 7 September 2020, it was announced that Casey has signed for his former loan club Gosport Borough on a free transfer.

Career statistics

Honours

Portsmouth 

 EFL Trophy: 2018–19

References

1999 births
Living people
English footballers
Association football defenders
Portsmouth F.C. players
Weymouth F.C. players
Gosport Borough F.C. players
Basingstoke Town F.C. players
Havant & Waterlooville F.C. players
Bognor Regis Town F.C. players
National League (English football) players
Isthmian League players
Southern Football League players